Mikhail Sergeyevich Litvin (born 5 January 1996 in Petropavl) is a Kazakhstani sprinter specialising in the 400 metres. He won a bronze medal at the 2016 Asian Indoor Championships.

International competitions

Personal bests

Outdoor
200 metres – 21.38 (Almaty 2018)
400 metres – 45.25 (Doha 2019) NR

Indoor
200 metres – 21.92 (Kamenogorsk 2017)
400 metres – 46.26 (Kamenogorsk 2019) NR

References

1996 births
Living people
Kazakhstani male sprinters
People from Petropavl
Athletes (track and field) at the 2018 Asian Games
Asian Games medalists in athletics (track and field)
Asian Games silver medalists for Kazakhstan
Medalists at the 2018 Asian Games
Universiade silver medalists for Kazakhstan
Universiade medalists in athletics (track and field)
Competitors at the 2015 Summer Universiade
Competitors at the 2017 Summer Universiade
Medalists at the 2019 Summer Universiade
Athletes (track and field) at the 2020 Summer Olympics
Olympic athletes of Kazakhstan
Kazakhstani people of Russian descent